Caelan Kamuela “Kamu” Grugier-Hill (born May 16, 1994) is an American football linebacker for the Arizona Cardinals of the National Football League (NFL). He played college football for Eastern Illinois, and was drafted by the New England Patriots in the sixth round (208th overall) of the 2016 NFL Draft.

High school
Kamu Grugier-Hill attended Kamehameha Schools in Honolulu where he played soccer and football. Grugier-Hill began playing football in his junior year of high school as a safety and punter.

College career 
Grugier-Hill played for the Eastern Illinois Panthers football team from 2012 to 2015. In his freshman year, he made his first start against UT Martin. In both 2014 and 2015, he earned First-team All OVC honors. Grugier-Hill reportedly became the first player ejected in the 2014 college football season when he punched a Minnesota lineman in the groin.

Professional career

New England Patriots
The New England Patriots selected Grugier-Hill in the sixth round (208th overall) of the 2016 NFL Draft.

On May 5, 2016, the New England Patriots signed Grugier-Hill to a four-year, $2.44 million contract that includes a signing bonus of $100,356. On September 3, 2016, he was waived by the Patriots as part of final roster cuts.

Philadelphia Eagles
On September 4, 2016, the Philadelphia Eagles claimed Grugier-Hill off waivers. He recorded his first career tackle and his only tackle of the 2016 season when he brought down Duke Johnson of the Cleveland Browns for a loss of six yards in Week 1 at Lincoln Financial Field. Because the tackle came on a fake punt, it was technically the only defensive snap which Grugier-Hill played in his rookie year.

On November 19, 2017, Grugier-Hill filled in on kickoffs for kicker Jake Elliott after Elliott suffered a concussion against the Dallas Cowboys. Grugier-Hill did not attempt a field goal or an extra point as the Eagles went for a two-point conversion after every touchdown. The Eagles went on to win the game 37–9. Grugier-Hill won his first Super Bowl ring when the Eagles defeated the New England Patriots in Super Bowl LII 41–33.

Grugier-Hill recorded his first career interception by picking off a pass from New York Giants quarterback Eli Manning on October 11, 2018.

Grugier-Hill was placed on injured reserve on December 18, 2019, after being diagnosed with a lower lumbar disc herniation.

Miami Dolphins
On March 21, 2020, Grugier-Hill signed a one-year contract with the Miami Dolphins which reunited him with head coach Brian Flores, who had previously been the linebackers coach for the New England Patriots.

Houston Texans
On March 23, 2021, Grugier-Hill signed a one-year contract with the Houston Texans.

On December 5, 2021, in a game against the Indianapolis Colts, Grugier-Hill set the Texans' franchise record for tackles in a single game, with 19 tackles.

On March 24, 2022, Grugier-Hill re-signed with the Texans.

On October 26, 2022, Grugier-Hill asked for and was granted his release from the Texans.

Arizona Cardinals
On November 2, 2022, Grugier-Hill signed with the Arizona Cardinals.

References 

1994 births
Living people
American football linebackers
American football safeties
Arizona Cardinals players
Eastern Illinois Panthers football players
Houston Texans players
Kamehameha Schools alumni
Miami Dolphins players
New England Patriots players
People from Hawaii (island)
Players of American football from Hawaii
Philadelphia Eagles players